Padlei is a former community in the Kivalliq Region of Nunavut, Canada. It is located on the mainland on the north shore of Kinga (Kingarvalik) Lake at the juncture of the Maguse River. Whale Cove is to the east, while the Henik Lakes are to the southwest.

History
Containing three buildings, Padlei was the site of a trading post operated by the Hudson's Bay Company from 1926 to 1960. The subgroup of Caribou Inuit who frequented the post were the Padleimiut (or Padlirmiut, or Paallirmiut, or Patlirmiut).

See also
 List of communities in Nunavut

References

Further reading
 Harrington, R., & Carpenter, E. S. (2000). Padlei diary, 1950: An account of the Padleimiut Eskimo in the Keewatin District west of Hudson Bay during the early months of 1950. [S.l.]: Rock Foundation. 

Ghost towns in Nunavut
Hudson's Bay Company trading posts in Nunavut
Former populated places in the Kivalliq Region